Backer is a surname. Notable people with the surname include:

 Agathe Backer-Grøndahl (1847–1907), Norwegian pianist and composer
 Augustin de Backer (1809–1873), Roman Catholic bibliographer
 Brad Backer (born 1956), Australian rugby league footballer
 Brian Backer (born 1956), American actor
 Cornelis Andries Backer (1874–1963), Dutch botanist
 Deborah Backer (1959 - 2014), Guyanese politician
 Harriet Backer (1845–1932), Norwegian painter 
 Jacob Adriaensz Backer (1609–1651), Dutch painter
 Lars Backer (1892–1930), Norwegian architect
 Marijn Backer (born 1956), Dutch author
 Par Backer (born 1982), Swedish ice hockey player
 P. A. Backer (1940–1993), Malayalam film directors

May also refer to 
 Backer, somebody who contributed money to a crowdfunding project
 Backer, the name of a VHS-based computer backup system manufactured by Danmere

See also 
 Bäcker (Baecker)
 Baker (surname)
 Bakker
 Becker (surname)
 de Backer

Norwegian-language surnames
Dutch-language surnames
German-language surnames
Occupational surnames

de:Backer